The Electronic Document System (EDS)  was an early hypertext system – also known as the Interactive Graphical Documents (IGD) hypermedia system – focused on creation of interactive documents such as equipment repair manuals or computer-aided instruction texts with embedded links and graphics. EDS was a 1978–1981 research project at Brown University by Steven Feiner, Sandor Nagy and Andries van Dam.

EDS used a dedicated Ramtech raster display and VAX-11/780 computer to create and navigate a network of graphic pages containing interactive graphic buttons. Graphic buttons had programmed behaviors such as invoking an animation, linking to another page, or exposing an additional level of detail.

The system had three automatically created navigation aids:
 a timeline showing thumbnail images of pages traversed;
 a 'neighbors' display showing thumbnails of all pages linking to the current page on the left, and all pages reachable from the current page on the right;
 a visual display of thumbnail page images arranged by page keyword, color coded by chapter.

Unlike most hypertext systems, EDS incorporated state variables associated with each page. For example, clicking a button indicating a particular hardware fault might set a state variable that would expose a new set of buttons with links to a relevant choice of diagnostic pages. The EDS model prefigured graphic hypertext systems such as Apple's HyperCard.

References 

van Dam, Andries. (1988, July). Hypertext '87 keynote address. Communications of the ACM, 31, 887–895.
Feiner, Steven; Nagy, Sandor; van Dam, Andries. (1981). An integrated system for creating and presenting complex computer-based documents. SIGGRAPH Proceedings of the 8th annual conference on Computer graphics and interactive techniques, Dallas Texas.
 
Brown University Department of Computer Science. (2019, 23 May). A Half-Century of Hypertext at Brown: A Symposium.

Hypertext
Brown University
History of human–computer interaction